Ken(neth) or Kenny Cooper may refer to:

 Ken Cooper (American football coach) (1937–2017), American football player and coach, head football coach at the University of Mississippi (1974–1977)
 Ken Cooper (American football guard) (1923–1997), American football player and coach, head football coach at Austin Peay State University (1955–1957)
 Kenneth Cooper (British Army officer) (1905–1981)
 Kenneth H. Cooper (born 1931), American physician, United States Air Force officer, pioneer of aerobics
 Kenny Cooper (born 1984), American soccer player, son of the previous
 Kenny Cooper Sr. (born 1946), English soccer player
 Ken Cooper (boxer), English boxer